Survival Zone is a 1983 South African post-apocalyptic action-thriller directed by Percival Rubens and starring Gary Lockwood, Camilla Sparv, Morgan Stevens, and Zoli Marki.

Plot 
In the near future of 1989, the world has collapsed during a nuclear war and the few survivors must make do as best they can. Ben Faber operates a family farm and is isolated from world events. They live a reasonably happy life until they are besieged by a brutal and cannibalistic motorcycle gang who want to eat men and reproduce with the women. The family is forced to protect themselves with the weapons found in the house.  Concurrent with this they have given a mysterious stranger shelter.

Cast 
 Gary Lockwood ....  Ben Faber
 Camilla Sparv ....  Lucy Faber
 Morgan Stevens ....  Adam Strong
 Zoli Marki (Zoli Marquess) .... Rachel Faber
 Ian Steadman .... Bigman Bigman

Background 
Survival Zone is a low-budget "B" film inspired by the Australian film Mad Max 2. Screenplay, direction and production  by Percival Rubens with a screenwriting assist by Eric Brown.

Reception

In Creature Feature, John Stanley found the movie predictable, giving it two out of five stars. However, he did find that the movie offers surprising philosophical take on life after an apocalypse.

References

External links 
 

1983 films
American thriller films
South African thriller films
English-language South African films
1980s English-language films
1980s action thriller films
1980s science fiction films
1980s American films